C-C chemokine receptor type 9 is a protein that in humans is encoded by the CCR9 gene. This gene is mapped to the chemokine receptor gene cluster region. Two alternatively spliced transcript variants have been described.

CCR9 has also recently been designated CDw199 (cluster of differentiation w199).

The protein encoded by this gene is a member of the beta chemokine receptor family. CCR9 is a seven transmembrane protein similar to G protein-coupled receptors.

Function 

Chemokines and their receptors, such as CCR9 and its binding agonist, are key regulators of thymocyte migration and maturation in normal and inflammatory conditions. The specific agonist or ligand that binds CCR9 is CCL25 also referred to as TECK in some literature. The effects of chemokines binding to their specific receptors is generally dependent on the structural placement of the N terminal cysteine(s) amino acids. Receptors are broken down into 4 family groups CXC, CC, C, and CX3C, because CCR9 has two adjacent cysteines it is a C-C family receptor. C-C family chemokines (such as CCL25) are often associated with the recruitment of lymphocytes. It has been found that this gene is differentially expressed by T lymphocytes of small intestine and colon, suggesting a role in thymocyte recruitment and development that may permit functional specialization of immune responses in different segments of the gastrointestinal tract.

Clinical significance 

The breadth of effects following interactions of CCR9 and its binding ligand CCL25 are vast and not completely understood, however, it is generally thought that CCR9 and CCL25 play substantial roles in cancer proliferation and inflammatory diseases. The location of CCR9 and CCL25 expression plays a substantial role in how it contributes to diseases. For example, the high expression of CCL25 in the epithelial lining of the small intestine, has contributed to its strong association and influence on inflammatory disease of the gut such as inflammatory bowel disease. However, CCR9 and CCL25 have also been associated with other inflammatory conditions such as cardiovascular disease, rheumatoid arthritis, and asthma. The role of CCR9 in cancer lies primarily in its ability to upregulate cell proliferation, metastasis, and the drug resistance.

Inflammatory Bowel Disease (IBD) 
CCR9/CCL25 interactions are known to contribute to the up-regulated migration of memory T cell homing to the gut given high expression of CCL25 in intestinal lining.  As a result, it is suggested that CCR9 and CCL25 have been a key focus in promoting a balanced pro-inflammatory and anti-inflammatory response in the gut. It has been observed that decreased expression of CCL25 and CCR9 contributes to macrophage recruitment in the gut as well as inflammatory cytokines which induces the observed inflammation in IBD. The inflammatory cytokines upregulated in the immune response of IBD are TNF-α, IFN-γ, IL-2, IL-6, IL-17A, and Th1/Th17. Overall, it is likely that the interactions of CCR9 and CCL25 provide substantial protections against large intestinal inflammation via its ability to regulate inflammation in the gut by balancing the presence of inflammatory cytokines.

Myocardial Infarction (MI) 
CCR9/CCL25 interaction reduction is believed to improve the survival rate, cardiac function, and reduce infarct size following myocardial infarctions. Additionally, reduced CCR9 expression following myocardial infarctions is also believed to attenuate apoptosis in the cells of the affected cardiac tissue while also reducing inflammation through the down-regulation of inflammatory cytokines including: IL-1β, IL-6, and TNF-α. Overall, CCR9 and CCL25 are believed to play a key role in mitigating the damage to cardiac tissue following heart attacks, while also aiding cardiac remodeling. The role CCR9 and CCL25 is thought to have in cardiovascular health has made it a key area of focus in clinical research.

Cancer 
CCR9/CCL25 interaction is believed to significantly influence the cellular functions of cancer cells and ultimately contribute to their proliferation and metastasis. CCR9 and CCL25 interactions are understood to suppress apoptosis observed by cancer cells. Apoptosis in cancer cells is  an essential mechanism utilized to mitigate the proliferation of cancer cells. The suggested reduction in apoptosis observed in cancer cells as a result of CCR9 and CCL25 interactions, ultimately supports the proliferation and metastasis of cancer cells. The observed proliferative and antiapoptotic effects of CCR9/CCL25 interaction, suggests the potential for targeted therapies that down-regulate CCR9/CCL25 for certain cancers including: leukemia, prostate cancer, breast cancer, ovarian cancer and lung cancer.

References

Further reading

External links 
 
 

Chemokine receptors
Clusters of differentiation